Carl Wright (February 2, 1932 – May 19, 2007) was an American tap dancer, actor, and comedian whose late life acting credits included Soul Food, Barbershop, and Big Momma's House. For several years, Wright teamed with Chicago radio legend Pervis Spann, playing a misguided and mischievous reverend on his Chicago television show "Blues and More".

Born in Orlando, Florida, he toured as a tap dancer as a young man, and for a time performed as The Three-Leggers with a one-legged partner. Wright died of cancer at his home in Chicago in 2007.

Filmography

References

External links

1932 births
2007 deaths
African-American male actors
American tap dancers
American male film actors
American male television actors
Male actors from Chicago
Male actors from Orlando, Florida
Deaths from cancer in Illinois
American male dancers
20th-century American dancers
20th-century American male actors
20th-century African-American people
21st-century African-American people